Keith Diamond may refer to:

Keith Diamond (songwriter) (1950–1997), American songwriter and producer
Keith Diamond (actor) (born 1962), American TV and voice actor